Richard Harden may refer to:
 Richard Harden (cricketer) (born 1965), English cricketer
 Richard Harden (politician) (1916–2000), Northern Irish politician
 Rich Harden (born 1981), Canadian baseball pitcher